Health secretary can refer to:

 Cabinet Secretary for Health and Social Care, Scotland
 Health Secretary of Pakistan
 Secretary of State for Health and Social Care, United Kingdom
 United States Secretary of Health and Human Services